Vestmarka is a forested and hilly area in Asker, Bærum and Lier which constitutes part of Oslomarka, Norway. The land is owned by Løvenskiold Vækerø and is a popular recreational area. It was the site of Braathens SAFE Flight 239, a plane crash on 23 December 1972.

References

Asker
Bærum
Lier, Norway